The John Q.A. Ward House is a historic house in Urbana, Ohio, United States.  Located along College Street on the city's western side, it was built in 1820 by Colonel William Ward, the founder of Urbana, as a wedding present for his son, John Anderson Ward. John lived in the house until his death in 1855.

John A. Ward's son, John Quincy Adams Ward, is the namesake of the house. A sculptor, Ward was known for multiple carvings of the Marquis de Lafayette, George Washington, and Oliver Hazard Perry.

The Ward House is historically significant for its early architecture. Based on a stone foundation, the brick house is a two-story structure built in an "L" plan. This well-preserved architecture, together with its connection to John Q.A. Ward, led to the house's addition to the National Register of Historic Places in 1974.

References

Houses completed in 1820
Houses in Champaign County, Ohio
Houses on the National Register of Historic Places in Ohio
National Register of Historic Places in Champaign County, Ohio
Urbana, Ohio